Yuri Gorbachev (born December 29, 1948 in, USSR) is a Russian painter and sculptor.

Since 1991, he has lived in the United States and creates in his Manhattan studio in New York City. He has been called the "Russian Rousseau".

Over the last forty years Gorbachev’s career has reached the highest level of international art.
Yuri Gorbachev created his own unique technique of painting on canvas, using non-ferrous metals (gold, bronze), special varnishes and enamels, completely removing black from the palette.

Biography
Yuri Gorbachev's work is now represented in more than twenty museums worldwide including the permanent collections of The Russian National Museum, St. Petersburg, the Louvre, the Kremlin Museum, The National Museum, the Tsarskoye Selo, Palace of Alexander the Third, National Armenian Gallery, Martiros Saryan Museum, Yerevan, The Rudana Museum, Bali, The United Nations, The White House, the National Fine Art Museum of the Ukraine, the Moscow Museum of Modern Art and the Russian Museum of Kiev.

Since his arrival in the United States Yuri Gorbachev has exhibited his work in more than two hundred and fifty one man shows worldwide. Former Christie’s Auction House expert in Russian art, Maria Paphiti, calls Yuri Gorbachev the ambassador of Russia for world art.

For the past twenty years Gorbachev has traveled extensively; his artistic development moved from his naive style to his most recent intricate works. He uses a sophisticated technique with precious metals like gold and copper along with specially formulated lacquers over oil on canvas; he never uses black in his palette, leading art critics to call his style “Positivism”. In the last two years, he has developed a new technique, which highlights his paintings with enamel creating added texture and luster to his composition.

The complex technique developed over two decades, using ceramic techniques on canvas is unique and inimitable.

Mr. Gorbachev’s work is represented in the personal collection of President William Jefferson Clinton and Secretary of State Hillary Clinton; his painting was personally presented in Washington on July 22, 1996.

In 2011, Yuri Gorbachev was commissioned to design a new label for Stolichnaya Red Vodka, The label he created “Four Elements, by Yuri Gorbachev” was based on his painting of the same name. It is destined to become a collector’s item and new icon for the brand. This is not the first time Yuri Gorbachev has worked with Stolichnaya. In 1994, “Stolichnaya” commissioned Gorbachev to design their annual Christmas “Holiday” advertisement, which appeared in hundreds of magazines around the world including Art & Antiques, Vanity Fair, Vogue, Time, American Photo, W, GQ, Elle among others. It was so successful that every year for the next four years he was commissioned to do a new image for the Holiday ad. Michel Roux, art collector and President of Carillon Importers, Inc. (distributor of Absolut and Stolichnaya vodka) was the person behind the creative advertising of Stolichnaya and Absolut. He used artists including Andy Warhol, Keith Haring and Yuri Gorbachev for the famous Absolut Vodka ad campaigns, creating a tradition of using famous artists for vodka advertisements to promote the brands with cultural icons. Roux described Yuri Gorbachev as “…the Angel from Russia. He brings out whatever is good from there. The spirit, the subject matter, and the colors of his work-profound in their simplicity-exemplify what Russia is all about.”

Americans of culture recognize Russia through his art. His energy and enthusiasm for Russia and the Ukraine, where he spent the last twenty years of his life in the USSR before moving to New York, are expressed in his work and help viewers understand emotionally and intellectually the culture which fostered his great energy and talent.

Gorbachev began his career as a Russian ceramics artist making sculptures, bas-reliefs and painting on ceramic plaques, which are displayed in many Fine Art Museums and galleries around the world. He arrived in the United States from the former USSR in 1991 with little knowledge of the English language but with an abundance of his great talent and charisma. Famous for his fine art ceramics for twenty years in the USSR he dared to change his medium to oil on canvas. The result was a spectacular success.

In 1993 Gorbachev’s first visit to the Far East showed him his true path as a painter – his connection to the Orient was immediate and dynamic and influenced both his style and technique. He brought these influences back to the rest of the world through his paintings. Gorbachev incorporated these different worlds and experiences– Russian, American, and Asian, into his art, and changed and developed into the unique artist he is today.

On March 14, 1996, the United Nations honored Yuri Gorbachev with a commission to create an original work in conjunction with the release of the United Nations stamp “Endangered Species.” Secretary General Boutros Boutros-Ghali received Gorbachev’s rendition of Green Parrot On Red Flower at a preview exhibition.

Yuri Gorbachev was classically trained in Soviet art academies and also acquired advanced degrees in philosophy and communication. His most notable accomplishment through his art has been his success in bringing many different cultures together in his own simple language of beauty. His use of lacquer and glazing techniques in his paintings exhibit his classic training and mastery of ceramics. Gorbachev’s artistic career has flourished in New York City and he has had solo exhibits all over the United States and Europe.

Recognizing Gorbachev’s great talent and influence as an artist not only in the United States, but worldwide, Rizzoli International, published “The Art of Yuri Gorbachev” in 1998. It presents 100 full-color plates divided into thematic sections spanning Gorbachev’s career. He is only one of a few Russian artists ever to have had Rizzoli publish their books; Chagall and Malevich are in this small group. In 2000, The

Bertelsmann Group, published “The Art of Paradise”, a major book about Yuri Gorbachev’s life and art 
explaining his symbolism, roots and development as an artist and containing his ceramics from the first 
twenty years of is career, his early oils and later more intricate works.

Mr. Gorbachev has had his work exhibited over the past several years at the Mora Museum of Russian Art, NY, 2011, the St. Petersburg State Museum of Urban Art 2010; the National Fine Art Museum of The Ukraine, 2000; the Moscow Museum of Modern Art, 2003; the Russian Museum of Kiev, 2005; the Odessa State Literature Museum, 2005 and 2006; the Donezk Museum of Fine Art, 2006; Museum Conjunto Cultural da Caixa, Sao Paulo, Brazil, 2005. Brazil’s major magazine, Caras, featured Gorbachev as person of the year 2006. Gorbachev’s exhibit, visited by many thousands of people, became a cultural phenomenon in San Paulo- his images were reproduced on T-shirts, scarves, clothing and worn by stars like the Rolling Stones, Bono, Jamie Fox, and many other visiting luminaries.

In June 2009, the first Russian Art Fair in London displayed a stunning array of the finest Russian art 
from the last millennium, including classical icons from the tenth century through the nineteenth century;

art from the Hermitage Collection; works by Faberge; classical painters like Goncharova, Malevich and 
Chagall among many others. Yuri Gorbachev aptly named “the angel from Russia” was the brightest and best of the living artists represented at the London Art Fair. Although Gorbachev’s art has been acknowledged worldwide and he has received numerous prizes and awards, he continues to work with inexhaustible energy with Russia always at the center of his inspiration. 2010 heralded a landmark exhibition of Gorbachev’s paintings. The St. Petersburg State Museum of Urban Art & Sculpture held a major and extensive exhibit of Yuri Gorbachev's works. Attendance broke all records for this museum, and the show was a critically acclaimed success.

In 2011, The Russian National Museum of St. Petersburg, Russia, the most important museum of Russian art worldwide, accepted Gorbachev's major oil painting Tsar Nicholas and his Family into their Permanent Collection. Gorbachev's museum tour continues through 2015, with the National Gallery of Fine Art Plovdiv, Bulgaria, opening July, 2012, the Literature Museum of Odessa, Ukraine, August, 2012, and future exhibitions in Major Museums in Kiev, Moscow, St. Petersburg and other countries. 2012-2013 opening new exhibition art Museum Shabo, UA.

In an article in The New York Times, journalist Carey Goldberg said "There is no better interview subject than a man who just wants to make people happy. A man so brimming with energy that he repeats and re-repeats words of emphasis, a man with a mission so simple and sweet that it works for Americans and Russians and Indonesians alike. And there is no better art, to my taste, than art that radiates the same kind of joie de vivre so that it acts as a tonic on all those who see it, uplifting not only with its beauty but with an exuberance as potent as the blooming of northern plants in summer.

Some collectors of Gorbachev's works
 Mikhail Gorbachev, former President of the U.S.S.R.
 Eduard Shevardnadze, former President of Georgia
 Joseph Estrada, former President of the Philippines
 Galyani Vadhana, Princess of Thailand
 James Jeffords, U.S. Senator from Vermont
 Mikhail Barishnikov, Russian-American dancer and actor
 Marcello Mastroianni, Italian film actor
 William Saroyan, Armenian-American author
 Nyoman Rudana, founder of Museum Rudana, Ubud, Bali, Indonesia

External links
 Yuri Gorbachev Official Site
 Yuri Gorbachev on Art Brokerage

1948 births
Living people
20th-century Russian painters
Russian male painters
Contemporary painters
Artists from Saint Petersburg
20th-century Russian sculptors
20th-century Russian male artists
Russian male sculptors
Ukrainian painters
21st-century Russian painters
21st-century Russian sculptors
21st-century Russian male artists